Raffaele Simone Quintieri (born 16 March 1982) is an Italian former footballer who plays as a attacking midfielder.

Career

United States

Captaining Miami United to the 2013 United Premier Soccer League, Quintieri was tasked with securing the championship and doing well at the US Open Cup, stating that the popularity of football there had risen a lot.

Malta

Registering his first outing as Qormi conceded 5–3 to Hibernians on February 3, 2014, the Italian viewed the Maltese Premier League's quality as good as the Lega Pro in his home country.

Malaysia

Among the new arrivals at SPA preceding the 2015 Malaysia Premier League, he came across the likes of Senegalese international El Hadji Diouf there, viewing the lifestyle in Malaysia as similar to Europe.

Indonesia

Greeted by euphoric fans upon arrival to Semarang United, the then 29-year old competed alongside an Angolan, two Australians, and a Brazilian, taking the number 37 jersey and supplying two assists in three matchups. Hoping to reach the first stage of the AFC Champions League, he considered the local standard the same level as the Italian Serie C2. Upon returning to Italy, he stated that he missed his celebrity status in Indonesia.

Aiding Sriwijaya at the 2015 General Sudirman Cup, his transfer was delayed due to injury, but ended up being dropped.

Kuwait
Putting pen to paper with Al-Jahra preceding the second part of 2015–16, the former Miami United man mixed with a Brazilian and a Cameroonian there, setting a top eight finish as the main goal.

References

External links 
 
 

Italian expatriate footballers
1982 births
Living people
Italian footballers
A.S.D. Igea Virtus Barcellona players
Qormi F.C. players
Al Jahra SC players
Association football forwards
U.S. Castrovillari Calcio players
Italian expatriate sportspeople in Kuwait
Kuwait Premier League players
Expatriate footballers in Kuwait
Expatriate footballers in Indonesia
Italian expatriate sportspeople in Indonesia
Expatriate soccer players in the United States
Italian expatriate sportspeople in the United States
Expatriate footballers in Malta
Italian expatriate sportspeople in Malta
Maltese Premier League players
Expatriate footballers in Malaysia
Italian expatriate sportspeople in Malaysia
Malaysia Premier League players
Sriwijaya F.C. players
Treviso F.B.C. 1993 players
PSIS Semarang players
A.C.R. Messina players
U.S. Città di Pontedera players
F.C. Lumezzane V.G.Z. A.S.D. players